Ghajini – The Game is a third-person action game based on the 2008 film Ghajini  It was published in 2008 by FXLabs and Geetha Arts, and distributed by Eros Home Entertainment.  It was hailed as India's first true 3D PC game. The Game consisting of five levels of play, following the story of the protagonist, Sanjay Singhania (portrayed by Aamir Khan), avenging the death of his girlfriend Kalpana by using martial arts, various weapons, and other artefacts.  Ghajini – The Game has earned Rs40 million. and has a manufacturer's suggested retail price (MSRP) of US$14.99

The game was designed by Shashi Reddy, who is the chairman of FX Labs, and Ghajini's co-producer Madhu Mantena.

See also
 Ghajini (2005 film)

References

2008 video games
Action video games
India-exclusive video games
Video games based on films
Video games developed in India
Windows games
Windows-only games